Sinhabahu (Sinha = Lion, Bahu = Arm) is a legendary king of ancient India, mentioned in Sri Lankan texts. He was father of Vijaya of Sri Lanka and king of Sinhapura. He was the son of Supadevi, a Vanga Kingdom princess. 
According to the Mahavamsa's folklore (the chronicled history of Sri Lanka), Sinhabahu's father was a lion and his mother a princess of Vanga, who was kidnapped by the lion. His hands and feet were like a lion's paws. 

When Sinhabahu was sixteen, he escaped with his mother and sister Sinhasivali, and arrived in the capital of Vanga. He later killed his father for a reward and was offered the throne of Vanga. 

He refused the throne, instead founding the city of Sinhapura, in the country of Lála. He lived there with his sister Sinhasivali, whom he made his consort. They had thirty-two children, of whom Vijaya was the eldest and Sumitta the second.

See also
 Incest in folklore

References

External links
 The Mahavamsa, Sinhabahu
 The story of the Sinhalese

Pre Anuradhapura period
Sri Lankan mythology

Mythological lions